Foggy Mountain Jamboree is an album by Flatt & Scruggs, released by Columbia Records in 1957.

It was re-issued on CD by Columbia Records and Legacy Records in 2005.

It was a 2012 inductee to the Grammy Hall of Fame.

Track listing
 "Flint Hill Special" (Earl Scruggs) – 2:47
 "Some Old Day" (Louise Certain, Gladys Stacey) – 2:29
 "Earl's Breakdown" (Earl Scruggs) – 3:01
 "Jimmie Brown, the Newsboy" (A.P. Carter) – 2:42
 "Foggy Mountain Special" (Louise Certain, Gladys Stacey) – 2:03
 "It Won't Be Long" (Johnny Anderson) – 2:31
 "Shuckin' The Corn" (Louise Certain, Gladys Stacey, Buck Graves) – 2:02
 "Blue Ridge Cabin Home" (Louise Certain, Gladys Stacey) – 2:55
 "Randy Lynn Rag" (Earl Scruggs) – 2:03
 "Your Love is Like a Flower" (Earl Scruggs, Lester Flatt, Everett Lilly) – 2:53
 "Foggy Mountain Chimes" (Earl Scruggs) – 2:16
 "Reunion in Heaven" (Earl Scruggs, Lester Flatt) – 2:53

Personnel
Lester Flatt - Guitar, vocals
Earl Scruggs - Banjo, vocals
Chet Atkins - Guest Artist (Rhythm guitar)
Ray Edenton - Rhythm guitar
Howdy Forrester - Guest Artist (Fiddle)
Josh "Buck" Graves - Dobro
Louis Innis - Rhythm guitar
Everett Lilly - Mandolin
Benny Martin - Guest Artist (Fiddle)
Ernie Newton - Bass
Jody Rainwater - Bass
Curly Seckler - Mandolin, vocals
Jack Shook - Rhythm Guitar
Jake Tullock - Bass
Paul Warren - Fiddle, Vocals
Howard Watts - Bass
Chubby Wise - Guest Artist (Fiddle)

References 

1957 debut albums
Lester Flatt albums
Earl Scruggs albums
Columbia Records albums